The 2014 Ethias Trophy was a professional tennis tournament played on hard courts. It was the tenth edition of the tournament which was part of the 2014 ATP Challenger Tour. It took place in Mons, Belgium between 29 September and 5 October 2014.

Singles main-draw entrants

Seeds

 1 Rankings are as of September 22, 2014.

Other entrants
The following players received wildcards into the singles main draw:
  Julien Cagnina
  Kimmer Coppejans
  David Goffin
  Olivier Rochus

The following players received entry as an alternate into the singles main draw:
  Jaroslav Pospíšil

The following players used protected ranking to gain entry into the singles main draw:
  Steve Darcis

The following players received entry from the qualifying draw:
  Andrea Arnaboldi
  Matthias Bachinger
  Yann Marti
  Maxime Teixeira

Champions

Singles

 David Goffin def.  Steve Darcis, 6–3, 6–3

Doubles

 Marc Gicquel /  Nicolas Mahut def.  Andre Begemann /  Julian Knowle, 6–3, 6–4

External links
Official Website

 
Ethias Trophy
Ethias Trophy
Ethias Trophy
Ethias Trophy